Astra is an American launch vehicle company based in Alameda, California. Astra was incorporated in October 2016 by Chris Kemp and Adam London. Formerly known in media as "Stealth Space Company", the company formally came out as Astra Space, Inc. in a Bloomberg L.P. article by Ashlee Vance. Investors include BlackRock, Advance, ACME, Airbus Ventures, Innovation Endeavors, Salesforce co-founder Marc Benioff, former Disney CEO Michael Eisner, and more.

History 
Astra was founded in October 2016 by Chris Kemp and Adam London.

Before being reincorporated as Astra Space Inc. in 2016, Ventions, LLC was a small San Francisco based aerospace research and design firm with a 10+ year history developing aerospace technology in partnership with NASA and DARPA. Ventions was founded in 2005 and located at 1142 Howard Street, San Francisco, CA 94103.

Following the 2016 reincorporation, Ventions, LLC employees expanded to a new building at Naval Air Station Alameda, known as "Orion", due to its location at 1690 Orion Street, Alameda, CA 94501. This former naval jet engine testing facility provided the ability to perform in-house single engine testing, as opposed to the former Ventions, LLC test site at Castle Air Force Base. Due to Naval Air Station Alameda's vast retired runways, the company was able to perform full vehicle testing very close to their headquarters, eliminating the need for expensive and complex logistics for rocket testing. However, this was diminished by choosing Pacific Spaceport Complex – Alaska (PSCA) as the only launch location.

During early to mid 2019, most non-test related employees moved from the Orion building into a new building at 1900 Skyhawk Street, Alameda, CA 94501, known as "Skyhawk". This allowed a large expansion of a previously cramped machine shop, additional in house machining capabilities, and a rocket production line in anticipation of Rocket 3. Additionally, this building has a number of known chemical contaminants due to its history as a Naval jet engine overhaul facility (Building 360) and is now designated as part of Naval Air Station Alameda Superfund site.

Two suborbital test flights were conducted in 2018 from Pacific Spaceport Complex – Alaska (PSCA): one on 20 July 2018 (Rocket 1.0), and one on 29 November 2018 (Rocket 2.0). Both were stated to be launch failures by the Federal Aviation Administration. However, Astra stated that both were successful and the second one was "shorter than planned". Astra spent 2019 designing and building Rocket 3.0 integrating propulsion systems, avionics, and other pressurization/plumbing components into a high-performance electric pump-fed orbital launch vehicle.

From 2018 to 2020, Astra was a contender in the DARPA Launch Challenge; first, as one of three teams, although at this point Astra kept its involvement secret and was only referred to as "stealth startup" by the Challenge organizers. Then as the other two teams dropped out, Astra remained as the only team in the competition. The competition involved launching two small satellite payloads into orbit from two different launch sites in the U.S. with approximately two weeks between launches. Astra attempted to perform a launch for the Challenge in late February – early March 2020 from PSCA, but had to scrub the launch attempts (due to faulty sensor data) and in the end, did not launch a rocket for the Challenge. With the competition's only remaining team (Astra) being unable to launch a rocket within the set time frame, DARPA announced the DARPA Launch Challenge closed on 2 March 2020 with no winner. The prize of US$12 million went unclaimed.

On 23 March 2020, Astra's Rocket 3.0 ("1 of 3"), the vehicle that was initially intended to launch as Astra's first rocket for the DARPA Launch Challenge, but which failed to launch within the challenge's launch window and was subsequentially reused for the next launch without DARPA involvement, suffered a fire on the launch pad (PSCA, Pad 3B) prior to launch, destroying the rocket. In September 2020, Astra attempted another orbital rocket launch, this time with their Rocket 3.1. The rocket cleared the launchpad and began to ascend before a failure caused all the engines to shut down. The vehicle began to quickly fall back down to Earth, exploding on impact. Next month, Astra was selected by the U.S. Air Force's AFWERX program to pursue the development of their Rocket 5.0, although it was not clear if the selection was tied to a specific monetary award. In the last month of 2020, Astra's Rocket 3.2 nearly (but did not) reached orbit after a launch from Kodiak Island, Alaska.

On 2 February 2021, Astra announced they planned to go public through a reverse merger with special-purpose acquisition company Holicity in a deal that valued the rocket company at a $2.1 billion enterprise value. Later in February, Astra announced the appointment of former Apple engineering leader Benjamin Lyon as its new chief engineer. In July, Astra completed its first day as a public company on the Nasdaq, the first publicly traded space launch and rocket company on the exchange.

On 28 August 2021, the Rocket 3.3 vehicle (serial number LV0006) failed to reach orbit. Following an "unexpected sideways ascent off the pad" due to a single engine failure on the first stage less than one second after liftoff, the rocket's engines were commanded to shut off by range safety at 2 minutes and 28 seconds into the flight. The flight was subsequently terminated, but reached an altitude of  before crashing into the ocean downrange. A fueling system propellant leak was determined as the root cause of the engine outage. About three months later, on 20 November 2021, Astra's Rocket 3.3 vehicle (serial number LV0007) successfully reached orbit after launching from Pacific Spaceport Complex – Alaska (PSCA) carrying the demonstration payload STP-27AD2 for the United States Space Force. Achieving an orbital launch in just five years and one month after Astra was founded, "Astra became the fastest company to reach orbit with a privately developed liquid-fueled rocket" over a year less than SpaceX at six years and four months.

On 10 February 2022, on their first launch from Cape Canaveral Space Force Station, Astra Rocket LV0008 experienced an in-flight anomaly on the ELaNA-41 mission for NASA, during stage separation. After two previous scrubbed launch attempts, ignition and launch of LV0008 occurred nominally. Shortly after main engine cutoff (MECO), an electrical issue caused a failed separation of the payload fairing, with 2 of the 5 separation mechanisms firing incorrectly. Another error spotted in an investigation carried out by Astra was that the thrust vector control (TVC) system on the upper stage engine failed, which caused an uncontrolled spin. About one month later, Astra's return to flight successfully reached orbit with the Astra-1 mission on 15 March 2022. The vehicle was the Rocket 3.3, LV0009. The Astra-1 mission is the first of 3 missions for SpaceFlight Inc. and launched the NearSpace S4 Crossover Satellite. Everything worked as planned, with no issues. The mission was originally scrubbed on 14 March 2022 due to bad weather. The LV0009 mission also launched Portland Aerospace Society's small cubesat called OreSat0, that was built at the Portland State University in Oregon. The satellite is a technology pathfinder that will stay attached to the upper-stage of the Astra 3.3 launch vehicle, and will prove the technology's functionality and operation state in orbit. However, after the successful return to flight, Astra rocket LV0010 failed to launch the TROPICS-1 mission. LV0010 suffered an early second-stage engine cutoff and failed to deliver the payload to orbit.

On 4 August 2022, together with the release of the Q2 2022 financial results, Astra announced that following two out of last four Rocket 3.3 launches being unsuccessful they intended to fully transition to the upgraded Rocket 4 whose maiden flight has been subsequently rescheduled to 2023. Because of that, all the remaining Rocket 3.3 launches had been cancelled and the company is currently in talks with its customers to remanifest their payloads on Rocket 4.

Launch vehicles

Satellite bus 
Astra is developing a satellite bus for customer payloads. The first prototypes are planned for launch in 2022 on Rocket 3 launch vehicles, with customer services commencing in 2023.

References

External links 

 
 

 
Private spaceflight companies
Companies based in San Francisco
Companies based in Alameda, California
Aerospace companies of the United States
Rocket engine manufacturers of the United States
Astra
Ventions
Astra
Ventions
Astra
Ventions
Companies listed on the Nasdaq